Henning Mühlleitner (born 15 July 1997) is a German swimmer. He competed in the men's 400 metre freestyle event at the 2018 European Aquatics Championships, winning the bronze medal and a gold medal in the 4x200m mixed freestyle relay. The 2020 Tokyo Olympian placed 4th in the men's 400 metre freestyle. At the 2022 European Aquatics Championships, Henning went on to achieve a bronze medal in the men's 400 metre freestyle. He trains with his club coach, Matt Magee, at ONEflow Aquatics in Neckarsulm, Germany.

References

External links
 

1997 births
Living people
German male swimmers
People from Emmendingen
Sportspeople from Freiburg (region)
German male freestyle swimmers
European Aquatics Championships medalists in swimming
Swimmers at the 2015 European Games
European Games medalists in swimming
European Games bronze medalists for Germany
Swimmers at the 2020 Summer Olympics
Olympic swimmers of Germany
20th-century German people
21st-century German people